Cham Gol (also Romanized as Cham-e Gol) is a village in Bakesh-e Do Rural District, in the Central District of Mamasani County, Fars Province, Iran. At the 2006 census, its population was 587, in 123 families.

References 

Populated places in Mamasani County